Rabia Makhloufi (born November 11, 1986 in Ras El Oued) is an Algerian steeplechase runner. Makhloufi represented Algeria at the 2008 Summer Olympics in Beijing, where he competed for the men's 3000 metres steeplechase. He ran in the first heat against twelve other athletes, including France's Bouabdellah Tahri and Kenya's Brimin Kipruto, who eventually won the gold medal in the final. He finished the race in eighth place by six hundredths of a second (0.06) ahead of Japan's Yoshitaka Iwamizu, with a time of 8:29.74. Makhloufi, however, failed to advance into the final, as he placed twenty-fifth overall and was ranked farther below four mandatory slots for the next round.

References

External links

NBC 2008 Olympics profile

Algerian male steeplechase runners
Living people
Olympic athletes of Algeria
Athletes (track and field) at the 2008 Summer Olympics
1986 births
People from Bordj Bou Arréridj Province
21st-century Algerian people
20th-century Algerian people